The Houston–Tulsa football rivalry is a college football rivalry game between Houston and Tulsa.

Series history
Since 2014, both schools have been members of the American Athletic Conference. They previously competed together in Conference USA from 2005 to 2012 and the Missouri Valley Conference from 1951 to 1959, as well as playing regularly while Houston was independent (1960–75). The rivalry was particularly heated during the Conference USA period, when the two teams dominated the C-USA West Division. Tulsa won the division title in 2005, 2007, 2008, and 2012, while Houston won in 2006, 2009, and 2011. SMU in 2010 was the only other team to win the title during this period.

An infamous game in the rivalry occurred on November 23, 1968, when Tulsa traveled to the Astrodome despite the fact that most of the team, including 15 of 22 starters, was sick with the flu. Houston, which already boasted the nation's top scoring offense coming into the game, proceeded to win 100–6 after scoring 76 unanswered points in the second half. As of 2022, Houston remains the most recent NCAA Division I team to score 100 points in a game.

Tulsa is Houston's most played opponent in football, while Houston is Tulsa's third-most played active opponent.

Houston announced that they will join the Big 12 Conference on July 1, 2023, putting the future of the rivalry in doubt.

Game results
Rankings are from the AP Poll released prior to the game.

See also  
 List of NCAA college football rivalry games

References

College football rivalries in the United States
Houston Cougars football
Tulsa Golden Hurricane football